Kelly MacDonald (born May 26, 1988 in Edmonton, Alberta) is a diver from Canada. She won a bronze medal at the 2007 Pan American Games in the 3m Synchronized event alongside Meaghan Benfeito.

References

External links
Canadian Olympic Committee

1988 births
Living people
Canadian female divers
Divers at the 2007 Pan American Games
Divers at the 2008 Summer Olympics
Olympic divers of Canada
Divers from Edmonton
Pan American Games bronze medalists for Canada
Pan American Games medalists in diving
Medalists at the 2007 Pan American Games
21st-century Canadian women